Telfs is a market town in the district of Innsbruck-Land in the Austrian state of Tyrol,  west of Innsbruck. It is the third largest municipality in Tyrol. Telfs received its status in 1908 and maintains its own district court.

Population

References

Gallery

See also
 2015 Bilderberg Conference

Cities and towns in Innsbruck-Land District
Mieming Range